The last four stages of the 2008 Copa Santander Libertadores are the knockout stages: the Round of 16, the Quarterfinals, the Semifinals, and the Finals.

Format
The remaining stages of the tournament constitute a single-elimination tournament. In each stage, the teams will play an opponent in a two-legged tie on a home-away basis. Each team will earn three points for a win, one point for a draw, and zero points for a loss. The team with the most points at the end of each tie will advance.

Tie-breaking
The following criteria will be used for breaking ties on points:
 Goal difference
 Goals scored
 Away goals
 Penalty shoot-out

Seeding
The 16 qualified teams in the knockout round will be seeded according to their results in the group stage. The top teams from each group are seeded 1–8, with the team with the most points as seed 1 and the team with the least as seed 8. The second-best teams from each group are seeded 9–16, with the team with the most points as seed 9 and the team with the least as seed 16. Teams with a higher seed will play the second leg of each tie at home.

Bracket

Round of 16
The Round of 16 was played between April 29 and 30, and May 1, 6, and 8. Team #1 played the second leg at home.

|}

First leg

Second leg

Fluminense advanced 6–0 on points.

LDU Quito 3–3 Estudiantes on points. LDU Quito advanced on better goal difference (+1).

Atlas advanced 4–1 on points.

Boca Juniors advanced 6–0 on points.

América 3–3 Flamengo on points. América advanced on better goal difference (+1).

São Paulo advanced 4–1 on points.

San Lorenzo advanced 4–1 on points.

Santos advanced 6–0 on points.

Quarterfinals
The Quarterfinals were played on May 14, 15, and May 21 and 22. Team #1 played the second leg at home.

|}

First leg

Second leg

Boca Juniors advanced 4–1 on points.

Fluminense and São Paulo tied 3–3 on points. Fluminense advanced on goal difference (+1).

LDU Quito and San Lorenzo tied 2–2 on points, and tied 0 on goal difference. LDU Quito advanced 5–3 on penalties.

América and Santos tied 3–3 on points. América advanced on goal difference (+1).

Semifinals
The Semifinals were played between May 27, 28, and June 3, 4. Team #1 played the second leg at home.

|}

First leg

Second leg

LDU Quito 2–2 América on points. LDU Quito advanced on away goals.

Fluminense advanced 4–1 on points.

Finals

|}

First leg

Second leg

References

External links

Knockout stages